The women's hammer throw event at the 2006 World Junior Championships in Athletics was held in Beijing, China, at Chaoyang Sports Centre on 15 and 16 August.

Medalists

Results

Final
16 August

Qualifications
15 August

Group A

Group B

Participation
According to an unofficial count, 25 athletes from 19 countries participated in the event.

References

Hammer throw
Hammer throw at the World Athletics U20 Championships